Astrolabe Lake (formerly Green Lake) is a lake in the township of Whitewater Region, Renfrew County, Ontario, Canada. Astrolabe Lake is where, in 1867, Edward Lee, a local farmboy, found Samuel Champlain's long lost astrolabe; a plaque now stands near the lake to commemorate this. The lake is a meeting point for the back end of both the local golf course, Oakes of Cobden, and the Logos Land waterpark. It drains via Buttermilk Creek and the Muskrat River into the Ottawa River.

References

Lakes of Renfrew County